This is a highly incomplete list of lichens of Sweden ordered by their scientific name. Swedish and scientific names are written in italics. 

 Arthopyrenia gemmata, Grå vårtlav
 Calicium abietinum, Svart knappnålslav
 Calicium viride, Grön knappnålslav
 Chaenotheca chlorella, Brun knappnålslav
 Coniocybe furfuracea, Ärgnållav
 Cyphelium tigillare, Ladlav
 Dermatocarpon aquaticum, Bäcklav
 Dermatocarpon miniatum, Sipperlav
 Erioderma pedicellatum
 Haematomma ventosum, Vindlav 
 Porina chlorotica, Skugg-vårtlav
 Pyrenula nitida, Bok-vårtlav
 Rhizocarpon geographicum, Map lichen, Kartlav
 Sphaerophorus globosus, Korall-lav
 Staurothele fissa, Brun vårtlav
 Verrucaria maura, Saltlav
 Verrucaria rupestris, Kalk-vårtlav

Sources
Björn Ursing 1964. Svenska Växter: Kryptogamer.

Fungi of Sweden
Lichens
Lichens of Sweden